The 2023 Troy Trojans football team represented Troy University as a member of the West Division of the Sun Belt Conference during the 2023 NCAA Division I FBS football season. Led by second-year head coach Jon Sumrall, the Trojans played home games at Veterans Memorial Stadium in Troy, Alabama.

Previous season

The Trojans finished the 2022 season 12–2, 7–1 in sun belt play to finish 1st in the west division. They beat Coastal Carolina in the Sun Belt Championship, and they beat UTSA in the Cure Bowl.

Schedule
The football schedule was announced February 24, 2023.

References 

Troy Trojans
Troy Trojans football seasons
Troy Trojans football